Francisco Miguel Soares Silva (born 9 May 1978 in Lamego, Viseu), commonly known as Chico Silva, is a Portuguese retired footballer who played as a left back.

His older brother, Jorge, was also a footballer.

References

External links

1978 births
Living people
People from Lamego
Portuguese footballers
Association football defenders
Primeira Liga players
Liga Portugal 2 players
Segunda Divisão players
S.C. Lamego players
Vilanovense F.C. players
C.F. Os Belenenses players
S.C. Dragões Sandinenses players
C.F. União players
C.D. Trofense players
F.C. Paços de Ferreira players
U.D. Oliveirense players
Sportspeople from Viseu District